Gladden is an unincorporated community in Dent County, Missouri, United States. It is located approximately ten miles south of Salem on Route 19.

A post office called Gladden was established in 1885, and remained in operation until 1972. The community most likely was named after the local Gladden family.

References

Unincorporated communities in Dent County, Missouri
Unincorporated communities in Missouri